Dundas was an electoral district of the Legislative Assembly of the Parliament of the Province of Canada, in Canada West, on the north shore of the Saint Lawrence River east of Lake Ontario. It was created in 1841, upon the establishment of the Province of Canada by the union of Upper Canada and Lower Canada.

Dundas was represented by one member in the Legislative Assembly.  It was abolished in 1867, upon the creation of Canada and the province of Ontario.

Boundaries 

Dundas electoral district was located in Canada West (now the province of Ontario on the north shore of the Saint Lawrence River, east of Lake Ontario.  It was midway between Kingston and Montreal, and close to the boundary with Canada East (now the province of Quebec).  It was based on the boundaries of Dundas County.

The Union Act, 1840 had merged the two provinces of Upper Canada and Lower Canada into the Province of Canada, with a single Parliament.  The separate parliaments of Lower Canada and Upper Canada were abolished.Union Act, 1840, 3 & 4 Vict., c. 35, s. 2.  The Union Act provided that the pre-existing electoral boundaries of Upper Canada would continue to be used in the new Parliament, unless altered by the Union Act itself.

Dundas County had been an electoral district in the Legislative Assembly of Upper Canada, and its boundaries were not aletered by the Act.  Those boundaries had initially been set by a proclamation of the first Lieutenant Governor of Upper Canada, John Graves Simcoe, in 1792:

The county was subsequently defined by a statute of Upper Canada in 1798:

Since the Union Act did not change the boundaries of Dundas, the new electoral district continued to use those boundaries.

Members of the Legislative Assembly 
Dundas had one member in the Legislative Assembly. The following are the representatives from 1841 to 1866:

Abolition 

The district was abolished on July 1, 1867, when the British North America Act, 1867 came into force, creating Canada and splitting the Province of Canada into Quebec and Ontario.  It was succeeded by electoral districts of the same name in the House of Commons of Canada and the Legislative Assembly of Ontario.

References 

.

  Electoral districts of Canada West